Songshan is a town of Rong County in eastern Guangxi, China, located  northwest of the county seat. , it has 13 villages under its administration.

See also
List of township-level divisions of Guangxi

References

Towns of Guangxi
Rong County, Guangxi